Fred Coppock (18 January 1905 – 23 January 1965) was  a former Australian rules footballer who played with Footscray in the Victorian Football League (VFL).

Notes

External links 
		

1905 births
1965 deaths
Australian rules footballers from Victoria (Australia)
Western Bulldogs players